Cake Bash is a party game developed by High Tea Frog and published by Coatsink. The game was released for Windows, PlayStation 4, Xbox One, and Google Stadia on October 15, 2020, later releasing on November 19 for the Nintendo Switch. In the game, players control cakes competing against each other in order to be chosen by a customer.

High Tea Frog is Gateshead-based indie studio that was founded by three former Ubisoft employees. Inspirations for Cake Bash include games such as Crash Bash, Power Stone, and Rayman Raving Rabbids. Cake Bash received generally favorable reviews from critics.

Gameplay 

Cake Bash is a party game where players control cakes competing against each other in order to be chosen by a customer. There are 13 different minigames in Cake Bash. Some minigames may involve the cakes fighting each other with melee weapons, while others may be focused on survival. Get Tasty, the main game mode, sees the cakes competing in a randomized selection of Bash games and minigames. Minigames that are played in Get Tasty are unlocked permanently. Before a minigame starts, the players can vote on where or what game they want to play next. Players who win rounds collect chocolate coins, which are used to buy toppings for their cake. Purchased toppings provide a score bonus. The cake with the most toppings at the end of a match wins. Players can unlock new skins, known as "flavors" for their cake. The game supports local and online multiplayer, allowing up to 4 players per session. Cake Bash can be played with bots, which can also be used to fill in empty spots.

Development and release 
Cake Bash was developed by High Tea Frog, an independent studio based in Gateshead. It was founded by three former Ubisoft employees. High Tea Frog developers Clement Capart and Laura Hutton listed games such as Crash Bash, Power Stone, Mario Party, Rayman Raving Rabbids as inspirations for Cake Bash. Cake Bash was shown off by High Tea Frog at the 2019 Game Developers Conference. The developers were originally looking for a publisher at the event, but had recently signed a publishing deal with Coatsink.

Cake Bash was featured at BitSummit 7 in Kyoto, Japan. A playable demo of Cake Bash was featured at the Indie Megabooth of PAX West 2019. The demo was available for free during the Steam Game Festival: Summer Edition. Cake Bash was one of over 70 demos available for free during the Xbox Summer Game Fest. In September, the developers released a free demo for the Nintendo Switch. In October, the game's demo was made available for free again during the Steam Game Festival: Autumn Edition. On October 15, 2020, the game released on Microsoft Windows, PlayStation 4, Xbox One, and Google Stadia. On October 25, Cake Bash was featured in Showcase E of IGN Japan's Indie Game Week 2020. Cake Bash was later released for Nintendo Switch on November 19.

Reception 

Cake Bash received "generally favorable" reviews according to review aggregator Metacritic. It received a score of 29 out of 40 from Famitsu, based on individual reviews of 7, 8, 7, and 7. 

Maria Alexander from Gamezebo rated Cake Bash 4/5 stars, calling the game's presentation "endearing" and commended the variety of minigames. Alexander believed that the game was slightly overpriced, and felt that it wasn't enough for those playing solo. Stephen Tailby from Push Square liked the game's concept, presentation, mini games, and controls. However, Tailby felt that the game's appeal didn't last long and thought that it was light on content. Nintendo World Report's Joshua Garrison praised the gameplay and visuals, but criticized the lack of crossplay and the lack of a single-player campaign. Nintendo Life's Stuart Gipp also praised the visuals, and called the performance "great". Gipp felt that there wasn't enough minigames, and believed that the game's outcomes were random.

References 

 Notes

 References

External links 

 

2020 video games
Fighting games
Multiplayer and single-player video games
Nintendo Switch games
Party video games
PlayStation 4 games
Indie video games
Stadia games
Video games about food and drink
Video games developed in the United Kingdom
Windows games
Xbox One games